Amy Hamilton Andreotti is an American biochemist who is the Roy J. Carver Chair and University Professor of Biochemistry, Biophysics and Molecular Biology at the Iowa State University. Her research considers TEC kinases including Bruton's Tyrosine Kinase (BTK) and IL-2 Inducible T-cell Kinase (ITK).

Early life and education 
Andreotti was an undergraduate student at Bowdoin College in Maine. She majored in chemistry and studio art. After earning her bachelor's degree, Andreotti moved to Princeton University as a graduate student with Dan Kahne. At Princeton, Andreotti investigated the impact of glycosylation on the conformation of peptide backbones. She primarily made use of nuclear magnetic resonance spectroscopy. Andreotti was a postdoctoral fellow at Harvard University, where she worked as a post doc in the laboratory of Stuart Schreiber.

Research and career 
Andreotti investigates intracellular signaling molecules. Tightly controlled signalling networks are responsible for cell growth and proliferation. Andreotti has shown that if a single mutation of an amino acid in proto-oncogene tyrosine-protein kinase Src can disrupt the mechanisms that inactivate the enzyme. As the protein remains active, excess phosphorylation occurs, which can cause cell death. In particular, Andreotti studies the signaling mechanisms in hematopoietic stem cells, including IL2-inducible tyrosine kinase and Bruton's tyrosine kinase. She has developed nuclear magnetic resonance spectroscopy to understand structure-property relationships of kinases.

In 2013, Andreotti was appointed Director of the Initiative in Biomolecular Structure. She was elected to the Iowa State University Biotechnology Council in 2018. In 2019, she was awarded a multi-million dollar grant to develop a cryo-transmission electron microscopy system at Iowa State University.

Selected publications

References 

Living people
Year of birth missing (living people)
American women biochemists
Princeton University alumni
Bowdoin College alumni
Iowa State University faculty
21st-century American women